Simen Matre Eriksrud (born November 12, 1975) is a Norwegian DJ, songwriter and record producer. He is best known as one half of the producing/songwriting duo Seeb, alongside Espen Berg, and a producer for several Norwegian artists. Simen is married to singer Simone Eriksrud.

He has produced Sie Gubba album Søndag e'det fæste, which was released in April 2002, and has been a songwriter and producer for Donkeyboy. He produced the song "Yes man", which was sung by Bjørn Johan Muri. He has also produced Ovi's "Playing with fire" and Maria Haukaas Storeng's on "Hold On Be Strong".

References 

1975 births
Living people
Norwegian DJs
Norwegian record producers
Norwegian songwriters
Musicians from Oslo
Electronic dance music DJs